María Santos was an Argentine actress. In 1943, she starred in Benito Perojo's Stella. Other notable roles include: Maestro Levita (1938), La fuga (1937) and La serpiente de cascabel (1948).

Selected filmography
 La fuga (1937)
 Melodies of America (1941)
 Seven Women (1944)
 Lauracha (1946)
 Story of a Bad Woman (1948)
 The Trap (1949)

References

External links
 

Argentine film actresses